Giorgio Theologitis (20 December 1888 - 22 June 1997) professionally George T. Katsaros was a Greek-American rebetiko singer, songwriter and guitarist, who was known for compositions of romantic ballads in the old style. During a carer spanning some eighty years, he performed in venues ranging from Greek restaurants, to ballrooms, hotels, clubs, and on ships international.

Biography

Born in Amorgos, he took the stage name of Katsaros', meaning Curly, because of his curly beard. His mother worked in the royal kitchen of King Constantine I. He emigrated to United States in 1913, where one of his first engagements was performing at a New York cabaret, and signed a contract with RCA Records in 1918. He was later contracted to Decca and Columbia Records, although his recording career was said to be less successful than his touring and live performances. 

For his contributions to music, he was awarded by the Secretary of State. the Florida Folk Heritage Award at the 38th Florida Folk Festival in 1990. In 1988, he toured in his native Greece.

Katsaros died on 22 June 1997 in Tarpon Springs, Florida, where he had resided since 1958, at the age of 108.

References

1888 births
1997 deaths
Greek emigrants to the United States
Greek rebetiko singers
Greek centenarians
American centenarians
People from Amorgos